The Vilayet of Adana was a first-level administrative division (vilayet) of the Ottoman Empire in the south-east of Asia Minor, which encompassed the region of Cilicia. It was established in May 1869. Adana Vilayet bordered with Konya Vilayet (in west), Ankara Vilayet and Sivas Vilayet (in north), and Haleb Vilayet (in east and south). Adana Vilayet corresponds to the modern region of Çukurova in Turkey.

Demographics
The accuracy of the population figures ranges from "approximate" to "merely conjectural" depending on the region from which they were gathered.

Economic history

It was described by the 1911 Encyclopædia Britannica as rich in unexploited mineral wealth in the mountainous districts, and fertile in the coast-plain, which produced cotton, rice, cereals, sugar and fruit. In 1920, the region was noted for its forested western region, which had little agricultural production. The Cilicia region was noted for its agricultural production, including wheat, barley, oats, rice, seeds, opium, sugarcane and cotton. Cotton production became more popular before World War I. In 1912, the region produced 110,000 bales of cotton and 35,000 tons of cottonseed. Pyrite was mined in the region in the early 20th century.

Administrative divisions

Sanjaks of the Vilayet and their kazas:
 Sanjak of Adana (Adana (seat), Hamidiye, Karaisalı)
 Sanjak of Mersin (Mersin (seat), Tarsus)
 Sanjak of Cebel-i Bereket (Yarpuz (seat), Osmaniye, İslahiye, Bulanık, Hassa)
 Sanjak of Kozan (Sis (seat), Hacın, Feke, Kars-ı Zülkadriye)
 Sanjak of İçel (Silifke (seat), Anamur, Ermenek, Gülnar, Mut)

See also 
 Adana massacre

References

External links

 

 
Vilayets of the Ottoman Empire in Anatolia
History of Adana Province
History of Mersin Province
History of Osmaniye Province
1869 establishments in the Ottoman Empire
1922 disestablishments in the Ottoman Empire